Brian Ombiji (born August 17, 1982, in Eldoret) is a retired Kenyan footballer.

Career

College
Ombiji attended Mother of Apostles Seminary for high school, and played for Kenyan club AFC Leopards, before moving from his native Kenya to the United States in 2003 to attend and play college soccer at Lindsey Wilson College.

While with the Blue Raiders he earned three All-Conference First Team selections, two NAIA All-Region First Team nods, the NAIA Region XI Player of the Year Award in 2004, and a spot on the NAIA All-Tournament First Team in 2005. In 2004, he was named both the Mid-South Conference and NAIA Region XI Player of the Year, and was an NAIA First Team All-American in 2004 and 2005. He finished his college career having scored 35 goals in 95 games.

During his college years Ombiji also played with the Michigan Bucks in the USL Premier Development League.

Professional
Ombiji turned professional in 2007 when he joined the Harrisburg City Islanders of the USL Second Division. He was a major contributor on Harrisburg's 2007 Championship team, scoring 10 goals in his two seasons with the club, recording five game-winning goals, and receiving an All-League Second Team selection in 2007.

After a year away from professional soccer in 2009, Ombiji returned to play with the Islanders again in 2010. He re-signed with Harrisburg for 2011 on April 7, 2011.

References

External links
 Harrisburg City Islanders bio
 2008 Harrisburg City Islanders featured players

1982 births
Living people
Kenyan footballers
USL League Two players
USL Second Division players
USL Championship players
Penn FC players
A.F.C. Leopards players
Flint City Bucks players
Lindsey Wilson Blue Raiders men's soccer players
People from Uasin Gishu County
Association football midfielders